Robert M. Solomon is a former bishop of The Methodist Church in Singapore, serving from 2000 to 2012. As bishop he was the head of this Christian denomination, which is one of the largest Protestant churches in Singapore. He is an ordained Methodist minister, elected by the other ordained ministers to serve a term as bishop.

Education 
Solomon earned an MBBS from the University of Singapore (now National University of Singapore) in 1980, an M.Div. (summa cum laude) from Asian Theological Seminary in 1984, an M.I.S. (Hons) (Intercultural Studies) from Alliance Biblical Seminary in 1984, and a Ph.D. in pastoral theology from the University of Edinburgh in 1993.

Career 
Solomon has worked as a medical doctor and church pastor. He was a principal of Trinity Theological College, Singapore. He was first elected bishop in 2000 and re-elected in 2004 and 2008, whilst ending his full quadrennial thrice elected term in 2012 (serving a total of 12 years). As of 2005 he was also vice president of the National Council of Churches of Singapore.

Works
He has spoken and taught ministry in many countries. He has also contributed many articles to books, theological dictionaries and journals and authored 19 books, including The Race, The Conscience, The Enduring Word, The Virtuous Life and The Sermon of Jesus.

References

See also
Methodist Church in Singapore

20th-century Methodist bishops
Year of birth missing (living people)
Living people
Alumni of the University of Edinburgh
National University of Singapore alumni
Raffles Institution alumni
Bishops in Singapore
Singaporean Methodists
21st-century Methodist bishops